Hwaseong is a city in Gyeonggi Province, South Korea. It has the largest area of  farmland of any city or county in Gyeonggi Province. Seoul Subway Line 1 passes through Hwaseong, stopping at Byeongjeom Station. Suin Bundang Line also passes through Hwaseong, stopping at Eocheon Station.

Historically, the former Namyang-gun region in the west and the former Suwon-gun region in the east form a heterogeneous landscape due to the large east-west gap due to the area about 1.4 times that of Seoul and the geographical condition stretching from east to west.

History

Universal Studios
On November 27, 2007 the city was chosen as the site for the future Universal Studios South Korea theme park. Originally set to open in 2016, it would have been the world's largest Universal Studios theme park, being larger than all the other four combined. The US$3.1 billion park is expected to create at least 58,000 new jobs. In 2014, the project was put on hold. The plan was restarted in 2015, and K-Water (Korean Water Resources Corporation) was chosen as a business partner. Universal Studios South Korea is no longer under development as of 2020.

Climate
Hwaseong has a humid continental climate (Köppen: Dwa), but can be considered a borderline humid subtropical climate (Köppen: Cwa) using the  isotherm. The city is located in the western area of the Korean Peninsula. The temperatures in winter are low along the coast since it is located in the lower plains and close to the Yellow Sea (West Sea), where the water is shallow.
Additionally, Siberian air flows directly into the western flatlands of the Korean peninsula, making several areas colder.

Demographics
Hwaseong is populated by 49% male South Korean citizens, 46% South Korean females, and 5% foreign residents. With 236,241 homes, there are on average 2.8 people per registered place of residence in the city. With the exceptions of Byeongjeom 2-dong, Dongtan 2-dong and Dongtan 3-dong, there is a larger number of males than females in every division of the city.

Administrative divisions

Hwaseong has 4 towns (eup), 9 townships (myeon) and 13 neighborhoods (dong). Each eup and myeon is further divided into villages (ri). In October 2014, Namyang-dong was downgraded to an eup- the first case in South Korea. "Hwaseong is old name of Suwon 'Hwaseong' castle built by king Jeonjo of Yi dynasty.
West area mainly called Namyang, East area called new city of Byeongjeom and Dongtan 1 new city. East side new city is under construction as Dongtan 2 city with 300,000 population smart city including SRT Dongtan high speed rail station, Ease side of Gyeongbu expressway in the Hwaseong East area started operation since December 2017. West Hwaseong is segrated by Seohae expressway from Ansan to Pyeongtaek port.

Local products
Many special products are sold in the Hwaseong area that are different from other regions of Gyeonggi-do. There are many facilities that grow products ranging from honey melons to herbs. Additionally, meat and dairy products are also available. Hangwa is also made by local companies as a specialty.

Symbols
Flower: Forsythia
Tree: Ginkgo
Bird: Pigeon

Sports
Hwaseong is home to the V-League women's volleyball team Hwaseong IBK Altos and the K3 League football team Hwaseong FC.

Notable companies
U-JIN Tech Corp., friction welding machines

Notable people
Cha Bum-kun, South Korean football player
Cho Yong-pil, South Korean pop singer
Lee Yong-jin, South Korean comedian
Yoon Jeonghan, member of k-pop group SEVENTEEN

Sister cities
 Burnaby, British Columbia, Canada
 Weihai, Shandong, China
 Wujiang District, Suzhou, Jiangsu, China
 Phú Thọ Province, Vietnam

See also
List of cities in South Korea
Geography of South Korea
Bongdam
Joam
Hwaseong serial murders

References

External links

City government website 
City Council website  

Cities in Gyeonggi Province
Hwaseong, Gyeonggi
음성자이 센트럴시티